Ram Sarup Singh VC (12 April 1919 – 25 October 1944) was an Indian recipient of the Victoria Cross, the highest and most prestigious award for gallantry in the face of the enemy that can be awarded to British and Commonwealth forces.

Details
He was 25 years old, born in a Rajput Tunwar family at Village Kheri Talwana, Mahendergarh and a Jemadar (acting Subadar) in the 2nd Battalion, 1st Punjab Regiment, in the British Indian Army when the following deed took place for which he was awarded the VC.

On 25 October 1944 at Kennedy Peak in the Tiddim area, Burma (now Myanmar), two platoons were ordered to attack a strong Japanese position. The platoon commanded by Subadar Singh attained its objective and although Singh was wounded in both legs he insisted on carrying on. Later, the enemy's counter-attack was halted by Subadar Singh's dashing counter-charge in which he killed four of the enemy himself. He was again wounded, but continued to lead his men, killing two more of the enemy, before he was mortally wounded.

The citation reads:

His medals now form part of the Lord Ashcroft VC collection in the Imperial War Museum in London.

References

Burial location

1919 births
1944 deaths
Indian World War II recipients of the Victoria Cross
British Indian Army officers
Indian Army personnel killed in World War II
People from Bhiwani district